Artis Kampars (born 3 May 1967) is a Latvian politician and businessman. He served as the Minister for Economics of Latvia. Kampars is a member of Unity.

Kampars became a member of eighth Saeima in 2002, was reelected four years later, but lost his mandate when he became a Minister in 2009. He served as the Minister for Economics of Latvia under the first two governments led by Prime Minister Valdis Dombrovskis.

References

1967 births
Living people
People from Tukums
Democratic Party "Saimnieks" politicians
New Era Party politicians
New Unity politicians
Ministers of Economics of Latvia
Deputies of the 8th Saeima
Deputies of the 9th Saeima
Deputies of the 10th Saeima
Riga Technical University alumni